The Ora Arena is the first purpose-built live entertainment venue in Turkey with a full standing capacity of up to 6,300 including ten VIP boxes for twelve guests each. The indoor arena, located in Bayrampaşa, Istanbul, is the prominent part of the Ora Complex, the first mixed-use project in the country. The cost of the investment amounted to  25 million.

Shows like Cirque du Soleil, Disney on Ice, Dino Merlin, Armin van Buuren, X Factor took stage at Ora Arena.

References

External links
  (in Turkish)

Music venues in Istanbul
Theatres in Istanbul
2011 establishments in Turkey
Bayrampaşa